Vieux-Boucau-les-Bains (in Gascon: Lo Bocau Vielh) is a commune in the Landes department in Nouvelle-Aquitaine in southwestern France.

During the 1970s, an artificial lake and a touristic complex were created and named "Port d'Albret ", this complex was built in the territory of Vieux-Boucau and the nearby town Soustons. During summer, the population is between 10,000 and 15,000 inhabitants.

There are three beaches along the Atlantic Ocean and one on the lake.

Geography 
The commune has the smallest surface of the Landes department.

Population

See also
Communes of the Landes department

References

Communes of Landes (department)